Platyptilia albifimbriata is a moth of the family Pterophoridae. It is found in Yemen and China.

References

Moths described in 2002
albifimbriata
Moths of Asia